Natalia Independent School District is a public school district based in Natalia, Texas (USA).

The district has four campuses - Natalia High (Grades 9-12), Natalia Junior High (Grades 6-8), Natalia Elementary (Grades 2-5), and Natalia Early Childhood Center (Grades PK-1).

In 2009, the school district was rated "recognized" by the Texas Education Agency.

In 2015 the board selected Michael E. Steck as its superintendent.

References

External links
 
 Boundary Map

School districts in Medina County, Texas